Lafontaine is a French topographic surname for someone who lived near a spring or well.

Notable people with the name Lafontaine or La Fontaine include:

 Allan La Fontaine, (1910–1999), Australian rules footballer
 Andrea LaFontaine (born 1987), American politician
 Antoine Ménard, dit Lafontaine (1744–1825), building contractor and politician in Lower Canada
 August Lafontaine (1758–1831), German novelist
 Charles Lafontaine (1803–1892), Swiss mesmerist
 De Lafontaine (1655–1738), French ballerina
 Denis La Fontaine (1929–2011), Chief of Air Staff of the Indian Air Force
 Don LaFontaine (1940–2008), American voice-over actor
 Eugène Lafontaine (1857–1935), lawyer, educator, judge and politician
 Fernand Lafontaine (1922–2010), Canadian politician
 Francis La Fontaine (1810–1847), chief of the Miami tribe
 Franz Leopold Lafontaine (1756–1812), German military surgeon
 Gary LaFontaine (1945–2002), American fly fisherman and author
 Henri La Fontaine (1854–1943), Belgian jurist and Nobel Peace Prize laureate
 Herb LaFontaine (fl. 1951–1953), Canadian ice hockey player
 Hilary La Fontaine (1937–2012), Kenyan-born British intelligence officer
 Ida LaFontaine (born 1997), Swedish singer
 Jacques de Lafontaine de Belcour (1704–1765), French entrepreneur
 Jean La Fontaine (born 1931), British anthropologist and academic
 John LaFontaine (born 1990), Canadian lacrosse player
 Joseph Lafontaine (disambiguation)
 Joseph Lafontaine (Berthier MLA) (1865–1920), Canadian farmer and politician
 Joseph Lafontaine (Shefford MLA) (1829–1907), Canadian notary, journalist and politician
 Joseph Lafontaine (Quebec MP) (1885–1965), merchant and politician
 Laurent-David Lafontaine (1823–1892), Canadian physician and politician
 Léonie La Fontaine (1857–1949), Belgian pioneering feminist and pacifist
 Louis-Hippolyte Lafontaine (1807–1864), Canadian politician
 Lyse Lafontaine (born 1942), Canadian film producer
 Marie-Jo Lafontaine (born 1950), Belgian sculptor and video artist
 Oskar Lafontaine (born 1943), German politician
 Pablo Lafontaine (fl. 2001–2005), Puerto Rican politician
 Pat LaFontaine (born 1965), ice hockey player
Pierre Dewey LaFontaine Jr. (1930–2016), American jazz clarinetist known professionally as Pete Fountain
 Pietro La Fontaine (1860–1935), Italian cardinal of the Roman Catholic Church
 Rita Lafontaine (1939–2016), Canadian actor
 W. Lafontaine (1796–1859), 19th-century French playwright
 Yves Lafontaine (born 1959; 1841–1921), wife of Canadian Prime Minister Sir Wilfrid Laurier

See also
 Lafontaine baronets
 La Fontaine (disambiguation)
 Lafontaine (disambiguation)
 De la fontaine (disambiguation)
 Fontaine (disambiguation)

References 

Surnames of French origin
French-language surnames